Nine Pound Hammer is an American cowpunk band formed in 1985 by vocalist Scott Luallen and guitarist Blaine Cartwright in their hometown of Owensboro, Kentucky. 

Nine Pound hammer was one of the first rural hardcore punk bands to substantially incorporate rural blue collar motifs into the minimalistic hardcore sound. Their lyrics (suggestive of outlaw country) featured themes such as alcoholism, rural poverty, and violence, and included references and homages to the likes of Jesco White and Dale Earnhardt. In contrast, most of the urban, experimental cowpunk bands of 1970s/80s Los Angeles and the UK were roots rock, folk rock or New Wave bands incorporating country music instruments and influences as a secondary (sometimes temporary) aspect of their sound.

Following the breakup of the band in 1997, guitarist Blaine Cartwright formed the band Nashville Pussy, which shares many of Nine Pound Hammer's musical and lyrical conventions with the addition of a lead guitarist and a more hard rock/Southern rock-focused format.

History

Nine Pound Hammer first played at The Ross Theater, opening for the Xtian rap group, The Disciples Of Decadence, in nearby Evansville, Indiana, with drummer Toby Myrig, David Epperson, and bassist Brian (Forrest) Payne, in 1984.  David and Brian left, and Bart Altman, thunderstick man from The Disciples Of Decadence, joined on bass. This lineup played a single show at the Ross Theater as The Yuppie Mop Dogs on August 31, 1985. The band played locally in Owensboro, Kentucky and Evansville, Indiana, garnering a very loyal following before relocating to Lexington, Kentucky as the Raw Recruits. The band then changed their name to The Black Sheep and became the house band at Great Scott's Depot.  Darren Howard replaced Toby, and the band became Nine Pound Hammer again. The name of the band is taken from the Merle Travis song "Nine Pound Hammer".

Brian Moore (Active Ingredients) and Rob Hulsman (Tarbox Ramblers) joined on bass and drums in 1988, just before recording the band's first LP, The Mud, The Blood, and The Beers.

The band has eleven full-length albums and several EPs.

In 2005, Nine Pound Hammer was asked to pen a theme song and lyrics for 12 oz. Mouse, a new Adult Swim animated series showing on America's Cartoon Network. Singer Scott Luallen also appears in the series as the voice actor for the character Roostre. More recently, they were featured on Aqua Teen Hunger Force Colon Movie Film for Theaters Colon the Soundtrack with the track "Carl's Theme," in which the lyrics play off of the character "Carl" and one of his lines in Aqua Teen Hunger Force.

Releases

Full-length
 The Mud, The Blood, and The Beers - 1988
 Smokin' Taters! - 1992
 Hayseed Timebomb - 1994
 Live At The VERA - 1999
 Kentucky Breakdown - 2004
 Mulebite Deluxe - 2005
 Sex, Drugs and Bill Monroe - 2008
 Country Classics - 2010
 Bluegrass Conspiracy -2016
 The Barn's On Fire (Live) - 2017
 When The Sh*t Goes Down - 2021

Other
 12 oz. Mouse Theme - 2005
 Carl's Theme - Aqua Teen Hunger Force Colon Movie Film for Theaters Colon the Soundtrack - 2007

Current line-up

 Scott Luallen (vocals)
 Blaine Cartwright (guitar)
 Earl Crim (guitar)
 Brian Pulito (drums)
 Mark Hendricks (bass)

Former members
 Brian Moore (bass)
 Matt Bartholomy (bass)
 Bill Waldron (drums)
 Bart Altman (bass)
 Rob Hulsman (drums)
 Adam Neal (drums)

External links
 Nine Pound Hammer on MySpace
 

Owensboro, Kentucky
Hardcore punk groups from Kentucky
American alternative country groups
Musical groups established in 1985
Musical groups disestablished in 1997
Musical groups reestablished in 1998
1985 establishments in Kentucky
Country music groups from Kentucky